The Portuguese Indoor Women's Championship in Athletics (Campeonto Nacional de Atletismo de Pista Coberta) is the top division of women's teams in Athletics in Portugal; it is a competition organised by the Federação Portuguesa de Atletismo. It started with few disciplines in the women's division, 200 metres, 800 metres, 3000 metres, 4 × 400 metres relay  and 60 metres hurdles, plus other like Triple Jump, Shot put and 3000 metres Racewalking. A year later it had all of the indoor disciplines practised. The league consists of 8 teams that are selected after a playoff. The current champions are Sporting, from Lisbon.

Portuguese Indoor Women's Champions

1994 : Benfica
1995 : Sporting
1996 : Sporting
1997 : Sporting
1998 : Sporting
1999 : Sporting
2000 : Sporting
2001 : Sporting
2002 : Sporting
2003 : Sporting
2004 : Sporting
2005 : Sporting
2006 : Sporting
2007 : Sporting
2008 : Sporting
2009 : Sporting
2010 : Porto
2011 : Sporting
2012 : Sporting
2013 : Sporting
2014 : Sporting
2015 : Sporting
2016 : Sporting
2017 : Sporting
2018 : Sporting
2019 : Sporting
2020 : Sporting
2021 : Sporting

Performance by Club

Championships records

Notes

References

External links
 Portuguese Athletics Federation Official Website

Athletics competitions in Portugal
Recurring sporting events established in 1994
Portuguese Athletics Championship
National indoor athletics competitions
1994 establishments in Portugal
Women's athletics competitions